Mark Crossan is an Irish former Gaelic footballer who played for St Eunan's and the Donegal county team. He also captained his county.

Biography
Crossan is from Letterkenny. He attended St Eunan's College, where he played for the school team.

Crossan is an All-Ireland winner with Donegal, one of three representatives from his club on the county panel that won the 1992 All-Ireland Senior Football Championship Final. He also won a Railway Cup with Ulster in 2000. He was also in the Ireland international rules football team in 2000.

He made his championship debut for Donegal against Armagh in 1993. With Donegal he also reached the All-Ireland semi-final in 2003. With his club he twice won the Donegal Senior Football Championship.

He started Mickey Moran's first game in charge of Donegal, a league win at home to Offaly in October 2000.

Since retiring from the game he does coaching.

Honours
 All-Ireland Senior Football Championship: 1992
 Ulster Senior Football Championship: 1992
 Railway Cup: 2000
 Donegal Senior Football Championship: 1999, 2001

References

External links
 Mark Crossan at gaainfo.com

Year of birth missing (living people)
Living people
Donegal inter-county Gaelic footballers
Irish international rules football players
People educated at St Eunan's College
People from Letterkenny
St Eunan's Gaelic footballers
Ulster inter-provincial Gaelic footballers
Winners of one All-Ireland medal (Gaelic football)